The ferruginous-backed antbird (Myrmoderus ferrugineus) is a species of passerine bird in the family Thamnophilidae. It inhabits the Guyanas and the northern Amazon Basin. Its natural habitat is subtropical or tropical moist lowland forests.

The ferruginous-backed antbird was formerly included in the genus Myrmeciza. A molecular phylogenetic study published in 2013 found that Myrmeciza, as then defined, was polyphyletic. In the resulting rearrangement to create monophyletic genera four species including the ferruginous-backed antbird were moved to the resurrected genus Myrmoderus.

References

ferruginous-backed antbird
Birds of the Amazon Basin
Birds of the Guianas
ferruginous-backed antbird
Taxonomy articles created by Polbot